Mitio (Michio) Nagumo (May 7, 1905 – February 6, 1995) was a Japanese mathematician, who specialized in the theory of differential equations. He gave the first necessary and sufficient condition for positive invariance of closed sets under the flow induced by ordinary differential equations (Nagumo/Bony-Brezis theorem).

Biography 
Mitio Nagumo graduated from the Department of Mathematics at the Imperial University of Tokyo in March 1928. In March 1931 he was appointed Lecturer in the Faculty of Technology at the Imperial University of Kyushu. In February 1932 he left Japan for an academic visit to Göttingen, where he remained for two years. Upon his return from Göttingen in March 1934, he was appointed Lecturer in the Department of Mathematics at the Imperial University of Osaka, and was promoted to Associate Professor in September that year, becoming Professor in the Faculty of Science in March 1936. In March 1937 Nagumo received a Doctor of Science degree from the Imperial University of Tokyo. In the 1960s he made a number of academic visits abroad, spending time at the Courant Institute of Mathematical Sciences (where he visited Kurt Friedrichs and other old acquaintances from his time at Göttingen) and the Federal University of Rio Grande do Sul in 1960, followed by a visit to the National Tsing Hua University in 1963-64. He retired from Osaka University in December 1966, after which he was granted the title of Honorary Professor. He was subsequently appointed Professor at Sophia University, from which he retired in March 1976, having reached mandatory retirement age.

Much of Nagumo's original work was published in Japanese and German, however his research and teaching have influenced numerous mathematicians (especially in Japan) who have since made many of his results available in English.

Works

Literature

References

1905 births
1995 deaths
20th-century Japanese mathematicians
University of Tokyo alumni
Academic staff of Kyushu University
Academic staff of Osaka University
Academic staff of Sophia University